Clinton St Hill (born 2 May 1961) is a Barbadian cricketer. He played in one first-class and one List A match for the Barbados cricket team in 1986/87.

See also
 List of Barbadian representative cricketers

References

External links
 

1961 births
Living people
Barbadian cricketers
Barbados cricketers
People from Saint Michael, Barbados